List of economic prizes may refer to:
 List of challenge awards or inducement prices
 List of prizes known as the Nobel or the highest honors of a field#Economics